Susan Margaret Dawson (born 20 January 1971) is a New Zealand rugby union coach and former rugby union player. She made her debut for the New Zealand women's national side, the Black Ferns, against Canada on 16 October 1999 at Palmerston North. She was part of the winning New Zealand squad at the 2002 Women's Rugby World Cup.

In 2018, Dawson was appointed coach for the Northland senior women's development team. She has also been the head coach of Pakistan's women's sevens team.

References 

1971 births
Living people
People from Te Kōpuru
People educated at Epsom Girls' Grammar School
New Zealand women's international rugby union players
New Zealand female rugby union players
Rugby union hookers
New Zealand rugby union coaches
Coaches of international rugby union teams